Robert John Nettleton Devoy is an Irish geographer. He is an Emeritus Professor of Geography at University College Cork and was formerly a Lead Member of the Intergovernmental Panel on Climate Change.

Education

Devoy studied at Durham University. His doctoral work, an analysis of sea-level changes and land subsidence on the Thames Estuary, was completed at Cambridge in 1977. His research interests lie primarily in coastal science, including contemporary coastal processes and coastal management.

Career and Research

Devoy moved to Cork to continue his research after graduating from Cambridge. In 1984 he was a Visiting Researcher at the University of Delaware and subsequently served as a Visiting Research Fellow in Geomorphology at the Australian National University in 1987, and as a Research Fellow at the University of Sydney in 1990 and again from 1992-1993. From 1992 he was the founding director of the Coastal and Marine Research Centre (CMRC) at University College Cork, working there until 2002.

More recently Devoy has concentrated on researching the implications of climate change on coastal erosion and water dynamics. He was a Lead Author on the 4th IPCC Assessment Report, which led to the IPCC being awarded the 2007 Nobel Peace Prize. He went on to serve as a Reviewer for the 5th Report published in 2014.

In 2015 he suggested it would cost at least €5bn to properly protect Ireland's largest cities and critical areas of the coastline. 2 years later he publicly criticized Cork flood defense plans, accusing the proposed scheme of being too reliant on an outdated study and not taking the threat of tidal flooding seriously enough.

References

Living people
Irish geographers
Intergovernmental Panel on Climate Change lead authors
Alumni of the University of Cambridge
Alumni of Hatfield College, Durham
Year of birth missing (living people)